A Dog Year is a 2009 American made-for-television comedy-drama film written and directed by first-time director George LaVoo and starring Jeff Bridges. It was originally broadcast on HBO on September 3, 2009.

The film is based on the memoir by Jon Katz and adapted by LaVoo. The story centers on a man experiencing a midlife crisis whose world is turned upside down when he adopts a border collie crazier than he is.

Plot
Jon Katz faces a midlife crisis. His wife moves out because he was growing too distant, their daughter Emma has moved to a place of her own, and he is left in the house with their two labrador retrievers and a severe case of writer's block.  A dog breeder who has read his books convinces him to take in an abused and hyperactive border collie named Devon – and his crazy new life begins.

Cast
 Jeff Bridges as Jonathan "Jon" Katz
 Lauren Ambrose as Emma
 Lois Smith as Lois Blair
 Domhnall Gleeson as Anthony Armstrong
 Welker White as Brenda King
 Elizabeth Marvel as Margo
Pamela Holden Stewart as Patti
 Deirdre O'Connell as Donna Brady

Nominations
On Thursday, July 8, 2010, Jeff Bridges was nominated for the Primetime Emmy Award for Outstanding Lead Actor in a Miniseries or Movie.

References

External links 
 
 Tribeca Film Festival

2009 films
2009 television films
Films about dogs
Films about pets
2009 comedy-drama films
American comedy-drama television films
HBO Films films
Midlife crisis films
2009 directorial debut films
2000s English-language films
2000s American films